Sportima Arena or Sportima Sports Hall is indoor arena in Vilnius.

Arena have indoor football field. Used for wrestling trainings.

References
 Stadiums in Lithuania. futbolinis.lt.

External links 
 

Indoor arenas in Lithuania
Sports venues in Vilnius